Stars is the 12th studio album by American singer-actress Cher, released on April 19, 1975, by Warner Bros. Records. A covers album of rock, pop and other hits, Stars was one in a string of commercial disappointments for Cher in the late 1970s. It charted at number 153 on the Billboard 200 at the end of May 1975. Cher's earnest delivery of ballads and uptempo numbers was overwhelmed in a market newly dominated by disco. After two more albums that sold even less well, Cher made a successful (if temporary) comeback in 1979 with the disco album Take Me Home.

Production and release
In early 1975, Cher began recording with Phil Spector. These sessions resulted in the songs "A Woman's Story", and a cover of The Ronettes' "Baby, I Love You". However, the album was eventually shelved. These songs were released as singles but were unsuccessful, and are now considered rarities. Cher then turned to Jimmy Webb to record this album. Stars was the first record for Warner Bros. Records and was also her very first without Sonny's influence as it followed Cher's divorce with Sonny and the dissolution of her relationship with David Geffen. Another novelty was the lack of the acute accent ( ´ ) on the e in Cher's name, which was always present on past albums. 

Only one (non-charting) single was released from the album, "Geronimo's Cadillac" (with the Jackson Browne song "These Days" on the B-side). In an attempt to boost sales, Cher appeared on The Carol Burnett Show and The Flip Wilson Show, performing "Love Hurts", "Just This One Time" and "Geronimo's Cadillac".

The album has never been released on CD or iTunes. According to Billboard, Cher owned this album's master rights and Warner had no right to reissue.

Cher had the album remastered and made available for streaming in its entirety on her official YouTube channel on July 16, 2021.

Critical reception

The album received unfavorable reviews from music critics. The Los Angeles Times said Cher's performances were uninspired, like a batting machine that always puts the ball over home plate, but never strikes anyone out. AllMusic website gave the album two out of five stars. Billboard gave the album an unfavorable review and said that the album's major problems are Cher's voice that sounds "strained and/or overdone on most of the cuts" and "the mood doesn't seem to change a great deal from song to song". They elected "Stars," "Love Hurts," "These Days" and "Geronimo's Cadillac" as the album's best cuts and praised the "excellent musicianship".

Track listing

Personnel
Cher – lead vocals
Art Munson, David Cohen – guitar
Dennis Budimir, Fred Tackett, Jesse Ed Davis – guitar solos
Jeff Baxter, Red Rhodes - pedal steel guitar
Colin Cameron - bass guitar
Jimmy Webb, Joe Sample, Larry Knechtel - keyboards
Gary Mallaber, Hal Blaine, Harvey Mason, Jeff Porcaro, Jim Gordon, Jim Keltner - drums
Fred Tackett, Pat Murphy - percussion
Robert Greenidge - steel drums
Cher Bono, Clydie King, Edna Wright, Herb Pedersen, Sherlie Matthews, Susan Webb - backing vocals
Gerald Garrett - bass backing vocals
Art Depew, Lew McCreary, Vincent DeRosa, William Peterson - brass
Abe Most, Buddy Collette, Don Ashworth, John Rotella - woodwind ensemble
Skip Mosher - woodwind solos
Fred Tackett - horn arrangements
Van Dyke Parks - steel drum arrangements
"Maestro" Sid Sharp - concertmaster
Technical
Jimmy Webb – production, arrangement, conducting
John Haeny – recording and mixing
Gary Webb – arrangement assistance
Bill King – photography cover
Norman Seeff – photography back

Charts

References

External links
Remastered Stars album streaming on Cher's YouTube channel

1975 albums
Cher albums
Albums conducted by Jimmy Webb
Albums arranged by Jimmy Webb
Warner Records albums
Albums recorded at Sunset Sound Recorders